Girl in Room 13 is a television movie that premiered on Lifetime on September 17, 2022. Part of Lifetime's  Ripped from the Headlines series of movies, it is about human trafficking and opioid addiction. The film stars Anne Heche, who completed production prior to her death. Heche appears in the film posthumously at the time of broadcast. The film is dedicated to her memory.

The film has played a role in conspiracy theories that arose after Heche's accidental death, falsely claiming that the film was about Jeffrey Epstein's sex trafficking ring and that Heche's car accident was actually an assassination by figures involved in the trafficking ring who wanted to silence Heche.

Plot

While recovering from a swimming injury, Grace (Larissa Dias) becomes addicted to opioids, and begins obtaining them illegally. She is ready to end her addiction with the help of her mother, Janie (Anne Heche), but is kidnapped by her drug dealer boyfriend Richie (Max Montesi), who holds her prisoner in a motel room (numbered Room 13) to break her down and sell her into human trafficking. The story centers on Janie's search for her missing daughter and her fights with the police to get them to take the case seriously.

Cast
Cast with named characters, in credits order:

 Anne Heche as Janie
 Larissa Dias as Grace
 Max Montesi as Richie
 Saskia Wedding as Red
 Matt Hamilton as Burt
 Brian Cyburt as Rex
 Erika Bruci as Toni
 Rhona Rees as L'Ryane
 Taya Seaton as Ivy
 Jason Deline as Officer Munson
 William Matzhold as Cray
 Brahm Taylor as Derek
 Madonna Gonzalez as Beth
 Sarah Peguero as Rosa
 Harmony Yen as Li

See also
 Gracie's Choice
 Girl Fight
 Polaris Project

References

External links
 

2022 television films
American drama television films
Lifetime (TV network) films
Films about human trafficking
Films about child abduction